Vidya Devi Jindal School (VDJS) is a boarding school for girls in Hisar, Haryana, India that was established in 1984 by industrialist Om Prakash Jindal. It was the first venture of his Vidya Devi Jindal Rural Development Trust. The school became functional in July 1984 and was granted affiliation by Central Board of Secondary Education the same year.

Houses 
The school has a house system with four houses based on four courageous women of India. Inter-house activities include cultural festivals and recitation in addition to sports and games. The houses are:
 Kasturba
 Sarojini
 Savitri
 Laxmibai

Facilities 
The campus has an academic wing, a utility block, a large auditorium, a health club, an infirmary, a dining hall with a seating capacity of 1000, an outdoor swimming pool, a roller skating rink and four hostels to accommodate 800 students. Accommodation for all members of VDJS is provided on the campus.

Foreign links 
The school has an annual exchange with Lancaster Girls' Grammar School in northwest England, St. Clement's School in Canada and Stanford Lake College in South Africa.

Notable alumnae
 Priyanka Gill, fashion journalist, entrepreneur and angel investor

See also 
 List of schools in Hisar
 List of universities and colleges in Hisar
 List of institutions of higher education in Haryana

References

External links 
 

Round Square schools
Girls' schools in Haryana
Boarding schools in Haryana
Schools in Hisar (city)
Educational institutions established in 1984
1984 establishments in Haryana